Cornelius A. "Cees" Bakker (born 17 March 1945) is a retired football referee and referee observer from the Netherlands. In 2015, Bakker was named bondsridder of the Royal Dutch Football Association (KNVB), an honorary title for his service to Dutch football.

Bakker was promoted onto the KNVB's B-list in 1975. He refereed his first Eredivise match on 25 August 1979, Vitesse Arnhem's 2–0 defeat at Excelsior Rotterdam. He was appointed to the FIFA International Referees List in 1988, but had already taken charge of Luxembourg's 4–0 home defeat by England in November 1983, and the first leg of the 1984 European Competition for Women's Football Final in May 1984.

In 1992 Bakker retired from active refereeing due to a knee injury. The KNVB nominated Dick Jol as his replacement on the FIFA list.

References

External links
Profile

1945 births
Dutch football referees
Living people